Group C of the 1998 Fed Cup Europe/Africa Zone Group II was one of five pools in the Europe/Africa zone of the 1998 Fed Cup. Five teams competed in a round robin competition, with the top team advancing to Group I for 1999.

Luxembourg vs. Ethiopia

Turkey vs. Armenia

Norway vs. Malta

Luxembourg vs. Malta

Turkey vs. Norway

Armenia vs. Ethiopia

Luxembourg vs. Armenia

Turkey vs. Malta

Norway vs. Ethiopia

Luxembourg vs. Norway

Turkey vs. Ethiopia

Armenia vs. Malta

Luxembourg vs. Turkey

Norway vs. Armenia

Malta vs. Ethiopia

  placed first in this group and thus advanced to Group I for 1999, where they placed second in their pool of four.

See also
Fed Cup structure

References

External links
 Fed Cup website

1998 Fed Cup Europe/Africa Zone